Ade is an unincorporated community in Washington Township, Newton County, in the U.S. state of Indiana.

History
Ade was laid out as a town in 1906.  It was named for George Ade, an American writer, newspaper columnist, and playwright, who was born in nearby Kentland and died in nearby Brook. A post office was established at Ade in 1904, and remained in operation until it was discontinued in 1912.

Geography

References

Unincorporated communities in Newton County, Indiana
Unincorporated communities in Indiana